Sigmund Freud (1856–1939) was the inventor of psychoanalysis, psychosexual stages, and the personality theory of Ego, Superego, and Id. Though the tripartite soul theory isn't a new idea by any means; being documented as early as Plato's writing. 

Freud may also refer to:
 Freud (crater), a lunar crater
 Freud, a chimpanzee in the Kasakela community

Arts and entertainment
 Freud: The Secret Passion, a 1962 film by John Huston and starring Montgomery Clift
 Freud (miniseries), a 1984 mini-series starring David Suchet
 Freud (TV series), a 2020 Netflix series starring Swiss actress Ella Rumpf

People with the surname

The Freud family:
 Amalia Nathansohn Freud (1835–1930), mother of Sigmund, born at Brody
 Anna Freud (1895-1982), daughter of Sigmund Freud, famous for contributions to child psychology and developmental psychology
 Ernst Ludwig Freud (1892-1970), architect, son of Sigmund Freud
 Lucian Freud, Ernst's son, painter
 Esther Freud, Lucian's daughter, novelist
Bella Freud, Lucian's daughter, fashion designer
 Clement Freud, Ernst's son, English politician, writer, chef and raconteur
 Matthew Freud, Clement's son, publicist
 Emma Freud, Clement's daughter, journalist
Walter Freud (1921-2004), Sigmund's grandson, chemical engineer, member of Royal Pioneer Corps and British Special Operations Executive
David Freud, Baron Freud (b. 1950), Walter's son, journalist, businessman, Parliamentary Under Secretary of State for Work and Pensions

Other people:
 Selma Freud (1877–?), Austrian physicist

See also
Freudian slip
 Freudian (album), an album by Daniel Caesar